Kenneth H. Tuggle (June 12, 1904 – February 17, 1978), a Republican, served as the 39th Lieutenant Governor of Kentucky, 1943–1947.  It was 53 years before another Republican was elected Lieutenant Governor of Kentucky.

Admitted to the Kentucky Bar in 1926, Tuggle maintained a private law practice up to his appointment to the Interstate Commerce Commission in 1953.  In 1939 he was the Republican nominee for Attorney General of Kentucky but lost the general election.  In 1943 he was nominated for lieutenant governor and was narrowly elected, with Simeon S. Willis at the top of the ticket.  Tuggle won by a count of 265,833 votes to 264,793; he had won just barely half of the vote against Democratic nominee William H. May.

In 1953 President Dwight Eisenhower appointed Tuggle to the Interstate Commerce Commission, was reappointed by President Kennedy in 1961 and Tuggle remained on it until he retired on December 31, 1975.  He developed a reputation as one of the nation's leading experts on the railroad industry.

Notes

1904 births
1978 deaths
Lieutenant Governors of Kentucky
People of the Interstate Commerce Commission
People from Barbourville, Kentucky
Kentucky Republicans
20th-century American politicians